LOL with The N is a series of four stand-up comedy specials that aired on Noggin's teen programming block, The N. The miniseries aired from May 30, 2003 to June 20, 2003. Stand-up comedian Mike Birbiglia was the host of all four segments. Each special features two aspiring teen comedians who get the chance to perform alongside professional stand-up comics. Behind-the-scenes footage, showing all of the comedians preparing their routines, is played after the acts.

The specials compared professional and first-time comics to illustrate how talents can grow over time. Kenny Miller, the vice president of Noggin, explained that "at the beginning of your career and after 10 years, you're at a different stage, and we wanted to represent all of that." The production team aimed to make the specials relatable to all teenage viewers, not just those pursuing a career in comedy. The director, Adam Idleson, commented that "there is sort of a psychic link between being a teenager and being a stand-up comic. It feels like you're out there on the stage alone against the world, and you're dealing with it with humor."

History
Production on the series began in January 2003, with filming taking place at the Gotham Comedy Club in New York City. The new performers were recruited from a training program in Manhattan called Kids 'N Comedy. Visitors were allowed to attend the taping sessions, which started on January5. The series premiered in May 2003 as part of a programming event called "Summer in The N." Each special was shown on a Friday at 7:00 PM.

Episodes

References

External links
 Official site (archive)
 

2003 American television series debuts
2003 American television series endings
2000s American stand-up comedy television series
2000s American teen television series
English-language television shows
The N original programming
Television series about teenagers